Z (Z [ZETTO]) is the fifth album released by the Japanese metal band Aion. Promotional videos were made for the songs "Truth" and "Ira Ira". There is also live footage of them performing the songs "So Many" and "Confession", recorded at the "Ariola Meeting 1993". This is the band's first release with new drummer Shu.

Track listing

Personnel
Nov – vocals
Izumi – lead and rhythm guitars
Dean – bass guitar
Shu – drums

References

1993 albums
Aion (Japanese band) albums